Church of St. Gertrude is located in the Old Town of Kaunas and is one of the oldest Brick Gothic churches and buildings of Gothic architecture in Lithuania. Located just off Laisvės alėja (Freedom Avenue), the church is somewhat hidden away and can be accessed from Laisves aleja through a gate at a hotel which is located nearby the Court building on Laisves alėja.

The exact date when the church was built is unknown, but it must have been in the 15th century. It was built as a churchyard chapel in the location of the former burial-ground nearby the city border near the road leading to Vilnius. In 1503 Grand Duke of Lithuania Alexander designated the church as a parish church of Kaunas. In the middle of the 16th century a bell tower was attached. The church was damaged in 1655 during the Russo-Polish War (1654–1667). It was rebuilt only around 1680. Around 1750 a wooden hospital was attached to the church. In 1782 it was abandoned for a long time, and at the time there were 5 monks from order of St. Roch residing. In 1796 the church was renovated, organs installed, and living quarters for a parson established. The church was consecrated in 1794.

In 1812 Kaunas suffered from a major fire, which also damaged the church. The hospital was abandoned, and in 1824 transferred to the sister order of Caritas. The monastery was closed in 1864 after the January Uprising. The old hospital was demolished in 1880. In 1921 the church was assigned to the Congregation of Marian Fathers and a monastery was built nearby. In 1920 the church was daubed. In 1992 a complex renovation of the church and monastery took place. Since 1991 the Mass is held in the church again, and the Marianites monastery has been returned to the monks.

References

 

Roman Catholic churches in Kaunas
Brick Gothic
Roman Catholic churches in Lithuania
Gothic architecture in Lithuania